Tyler Sam Houston (born January 17, 1971) is an American former professional baseball third baseman and catcher. He played eight seasons in Major League Baseball (MLB) from 1996 to 2003 for the Atlanta Braves, Chicago Cubs, Cleveland Indians, Milwaukee Brewers, Los Angeles Dodgers, and Philadelphia Phillies.

In 700 games, Houston tallied 479 hits, 63 home runs and 253 RBIs for a .265 batting average.

In the 1989 MLB June draft, Houston was drafted second overall (first was Ben McDonald) and was the first high school player chosen. He graduated from Valley High School in Las Vegas, Nevada.

On Sunday July 9, 2000, Houston hit three home runs against the Detroit Tigers. Willie Blair pitched for six innings and gave up Houston's first two home runs. Jeff Weaver gave up the third (440 ft). It was the first time in Brewers' history to receive a curtain call.

He now coaches at Cedar High School in Cedar City, Utah.

References

External links

1971 births
Living people
Atlanta Braves players
Chicago Cubs players
Cleveland Indians players
Milwaukee Brewers players
Los Angeles Dodgers players
Philadelphia Phillies players
Major League Baseball third basemen
Major League Baseball catchers
Baseball players from Nevada
Idaho Falls Braves players
Sumter Braves players
Macon Braves players
Durham Bulls players
Greenville Braves players
Richmond Braves players
Iowa Cubs players
Rockford Cubbies players
Beloit Snappers players
Scranton/Wilkes-Barre Red Barons players
Sportspeople from Las Vegas